The 2018–19 Green Bay Phoenix women's basketball team represented the University of Wisconsin-Green Bay in the 2018–19 NCAA Division I women's basketball season. The Phoenix, led by head coach Kevin Borseth, in the seventh year of his current stint and 16th year overall at Green Bay, played their home games at the Kress Events Center and were members of the Horizon League. It was the 40th season of Green Bay women's basketball. They finished the season 22–10, 15–3 in Horizon play to finish in second place. They advanced to the championship game of the Horizon League women's basketball tournament where they lost to Wright State. They received an automatic bid to the WNIT where they lost to Kent State in the first round.

Roster

Schedule

|-
!colspan=9 style=| Exhibition

|-
!colspan=9 style=| Non-conference regular season

|-
!colspan=9 style=| Horizon League regular season

|-
!colspan=9 style=| Horizon League Women's Tournament

|-
!colspan=9 style=| WNIT

Rankings

References

Green Bay Phoenix women's basketball seasons
2018–19 Horizon League women's basketball season
Green Bay